Ectasia, also called ectasis, is dilation or distention of a tubular structure, either normal or pathophysiologic but usually the latter (except in atelectasis, where absence of ectasis is the problem).

Specific conditions

 Bronchiectasis, chronic dilatation of the bronchi
 Duct ectasia of breast, a dilated milk duct.  Duct ectasia syndrome is a synonym for nonpuerperal (unrelated to pregnancy and breastfeeding) mastitis.
 Dural ectasia, dilation of the dural sac surrounding the spinal cord, usually in the very low back.
 Pyelectasis, dilation of a part of the kidney, most frequently seen in prenatal ultrasounds.  It usually resolves on its own.
 Rete tubular ectasia, dilation of tubular structures in the testicles.  It is usually found in older men.
 Acral arteriolar ectasia
 Corneal ectasia (secondary keratoconus), a bulging of the cornea.

Vascular ectasias
 Most broadly, any abnormal dilatation of a blood vessel, including aneurysms
 Annuloaortic ectasia, dilation of the aorta.  It can be associated with Marfan syndrome.
 Dolichoectasias, weakening of arteries, usually caused by high blood pressure.
 Intracranial dolichoectasias, dilation of arteries inside the head.
 Gastric antral vascular ectasia, dilation of small blood vessels in the last part of the stomach.
 Telangiectasias are small dilated blood vessels found anywhere on the body, but commonly seen on the face around the nose, cheeks, and chin.
 Venous ectasia, dilation of veins or venules, such as:
 Chronic venous insufficiency, often in the leg
 Jugular vein ectasia, in the jugular veins returning blood from the head

See also

References 

Anatomy
Pathophysiology